Christiane Duchesne (born August 12, 1949) is a Quebec researcher, educator, illustrator, translator and writer.

Biography
She was born in Montreal and was educated at the Collège Jésus-Marie d'Outremont, at the Collège Jean-de-Brébeuf and at the Université de Montréal where she studied industrial design. From 1990 to 1993, she was a researcher for several audio-visual production companies. She also was editor in chief for the magazine Décormag, an associate editor for the  Courte Échelle publishing company and director of the Kid Quid collection of the  publishing house. Duchesne has served on the board of directors for the Salon du livre de Montréal.

She wrote a number of scripts for Radio Canada, including an adaptation of Alice au pays des merveilles which received the Slovak Prix Court Métrage in 1998. In 1996, Duchesne was one of the finalists for the International Board on Books for Young People's Hans Christian Andersen Award for her body of work.

Selected works 
 La Vraie histoire du chien de Clara Vic, youth novel (1990), received the Governor General's Award for French-language children's literature and the 
 Bibitsa, ou, L'étrange voyage de Clara Vic, youth novel (1991), received the Mr. Christie's Book Award and the Prix d'excellence des Consommateurs
 Victor, youth novel (1992), received the Governor General's Award for French-language children's literature
 La 42e soeur de Bébert, youth novel (1993), received the Mr. Christie's Book Award
 La bergère de chevaux, youth novel (1995), received the Mr. Christie's Book Award and the Prix Québec/Wallonie-Bruxelles
 L'homme des silences, novel (1999), received the Prix France-Québec and the Prix Ringuet from the Académie des lettres du Québec; it was also nominated for the Governor General's Award for French-language fiction
 Jomusch et le troll des cuisines, youth novel (2001), received the Governor General's Award for French-language children's literature
 La vengeance d'Adeline Parot (2009), received the Prix Alvine-Bélisle

References 

1949 births
Living people
Canadian novelists in French
Governor General's Award-winning fiction writers
Governor General's Award-winning children's writers
Université de Montréal alumni
Canadian women novelists
Canadian illustrators
Canadian women illustrators
Canadian women children's writers
20th-century Canadian novelists
20th-century Canadian women writers
20th-century Canadian translators
21st-century Canadian novelists
21st-century Canadian women writers
21st-century Canadian translators
Writers from Montreal
Canadian women non-fiction writers
Canadian children's writers in French